The 2000 Women's Hockey International Challenge was a women's field hockey tournament, consisting of a series of test matches. It was held in Sydney, Australia, from 1 to 8 July 2000.

Australia won the tournament, defeating Germany 3–0 in the final. New Zealand finished in third place.

Competition format
The tournament featured the national teams of Australia, Germany and New Zealand, as well as a team from the Australian Institute of Sport. The teams competed in a double round-robin format, with each team playing each other twice. Three points were awarded for a win, one for a draw, and none for a loss.

Officials
The following umpires were appointed by the International Hockey Federation to officiate the tournament:

 Michelle Arnold (AUS)
 Judith Barnesby (AUS)
 Ute Conen (GER)
 Lyn Farrell (NZL)
 Marelize de Klerk (RSA)

Results
All times are local (AEST).

Preliminary round

Fixtures

Classification round

Exhibition match
 Note: Despite losing the match, New Zealand finished in third place as this was not a ranking match.

Final

Statistics

Final standings

Goalscorers

** = Denotes players in the Australian Development team.

References

External links
Hockey Australia

Field hockey in Australia
Women's international field hockey competitions